Daviesia striata is a species of flowering plant in the family Fabaceae and is endemic to the south of Western Australia. It is a rigid, glabrous shrub with erect branchlets, crowded, vertically compressed, sharply-pointed phyllodes, and yellow and red flowers.

Description

Taxonomy
Daviesia striata was first formally described in 1853 by Nikolai Turczaninow in the Bulletin de la Société Impériale des Naturalistes de Moscou. The specific epithet (striata) refers to the stem and phyllodes.

Distribution and habitat
This daviesia usually grows in coastal heath and is found in the south of Western Australia between Bremer Bay and East Mount Barren in the Esperance Plains biogeographic region.

Conservation status
Daviesia striata is classified as "not threatened" by the Government of Western Australia Department of Biodiversity, Conservation and Attractions.

References

striata
Taxa named by Nikolai Turczaninow
Plants described in 1853
Flora of Western Australia